Zbrojewsko  is a village in the administrative district of Gmina Lipie, within Kłobuck County, Silesian Voivodeship, in southern Poland.

The village has a population of 254.

Zbrojewsko was the location of a motte-and-bailey castle from the 14th century, which is now an archaeological site. Since the 1950s, archaeologists discovered tools and a bell-grave from the early Iron Age at the site.

Transport
The Polish National road 43 runs nearby, south of the village.

References

Villages in Kłobuck County
Archaeological sites in Poland
Prehistoric sites in Poland